Pascal David Schüpbach (born 11 April 2000) is a Swiss professional footballer who plays as a full-back for Breitenrain.

Club career
Schüpbach made his professional debut with Young Boys in a 3–1 Swiss Super League win over St. Gallen on 3 August 2020. On 11 August 2020, he signed a professional contract with Young Boys until 2024.

On 7 July 2021, he joined FC Thun on a season-long loan.

References

External links
 
 SFL Profile
 SFV U18 Profile
 SFV U19 Profile
 SFV U20 Profile

2000 births
Living people
Footballers from Bern
Swiss men's footballers
Switzerland youth international footballers
Association football fullbacks
BSC Young Boys players
FC Winterthur players
FC Thun players
Breitenrain Bern players
Swiss 1. Liga (football) players
Swiss Super League players
Swiss Challenge League players
Swiss Promotion League players